Billy Elliot is a 2000 film produced by the BBC.

Billy Elliot or Elliott may also refer to:

Entertainment
 Bill Elliott (musician) 2015 Tony Award-winning orchestrator (born 1951), bandleader, film composer
 Bill Elliot (rock musician), member of Splinter and the Elastic Oz Band
 Wild Bill Elliott (1904–1965), cowboy actor
 Billy Elliot the Musical, 2005 musical based on the film

Sports
 Bill Elliott (born 1955), 1988 NASCAR champion
 Billy Elliot (jockey) (died 1941), Australian jockey who rode Phar Lap
 Billy Elliott (footballer) (1925–2008), English footballer and manager
 William Elliot (rugby union) (1867–1958), New Zealand footballer

Other uses
 Billy Elliot (RHC) (1964–1995), Northern Ireland loyalist, leading member of the Red Hand Commando
 Billy Elliot (UDA), senior member of the Ulster Defence Association; East Belfast brigadier

See also
 William Elliott (disambiguation)
 William Elliot (disambiguation)
 William Eliot (disambiguation)

Elliot, Billy